Cathy Lomax (born 1963) is a London artist, curator and director of the Transition Gallery. Lomax is a member of the Contemporary British Painting group. In 2016 she started her PhD in Film Studies at Queen Mary University of London.

Life and career
Cathy Lomax is an artist mainly known for her figurative paintings. She earned a Bachelor of Arts in Fine Art from London Guildhall University (2000), and an Master of Arts from Central Saint Martins College of Art and Design (2002).

She is the director of Transition Gallery in East London.

Lomax also publishes and edits two magazines: Arty, a publication featuring artwork and opinions from a group of invited contributors; and Garageland, an art and culture publication which examines art themes such as beauty, machismo or nature.

Arty was started in April 2001 and is written and illustrated by artists. It was described by Alex Michon as "an antidote to the kind of dry academic writing about art which was becoming increasingly elitist and out of touch with the kind of riky tiky, hand-made and heartfelt work which was appearing in minuscule galleries throughout the land."

Artist Stella Vine has commented on Lomax:
It’s been great to have the support of Cathy Lomax at Transition Gallery, she has been one of the few people to really believe in me ... she’d say, “great do it, just do it all, you shouldn’t censor yourself so much, stop chucking stuff out !” Nice genuine support without any motive. Cathy paints a bit like Peter Blake.  I first came across Cathy’s magazine ‘Arty’ a little art fanzine at the Serpentine gallery bookshop ... the energy in her magazine, and the childishness of it, I thought she would be a teenager, she was my age...and she also was running her own gallery ... She’s been a rock...

In 2016 Cathy Lomax was announced winner of the inaugural 'Contemporary British Painting Prize' for her painting "Black Venus".

Shows
Exhibitions include:
The Blind Spot (Swindon Museum and Art Gallery, 2017)
The Image Duplicator (Contemporary Art Projects, London, 2009)
The Golden Record (Collective Gallery, Edinburgh, 2008)
Vignettes (Rosy Wilde, 2006)
She's No Angel (James Coleman, 2004) 
Girl on Girl (Transition Gallery, 2003)

See also
Alex Michon
Stella Vine
Nadia Hebson
The Priseman Seabrook Collection

References

Artnews, Stella Vine  interview by Iliana Fokianaki 2004

Books
 "Arty: Greatest Hits" Transition Editions,  (an anthology of excerpts from issues 1-16)

External links
Cathy Lomax's Transition Gallery
Arty Magazine
Cathy Lomax's commentart entry
Stella Vine's website

1963 births
Living people
20th-century English painters
21st-century English painters
20th-century English women artists
21st-century English women artists
Alumni of Central Saint Martins
Artists from London
English curators
English women painters
British women curators